Lorraine McConaghy is a historian working at Museum of History and Industry in Seattle, Washington, USA.

McConaghy completed her Ph.D. in United States urban history at the University of Washington in 1993.

She was the recipient of the Washington State Historical Society's Robert Gray Medal in 2010.  The medal is the society's highest prize, awarded for distinguished contributions to Pacific Northwest history.

Bibliography

References

Writers from Seattle
Historians of the Pacific Northwest
University of Washington College of Arts and Sciences alumni
American women historians
Historians from Washington (state)